Immaculate Heart of Mary College, Portaceli, Seville, covers pre-primary through baccalaureate and technical school. It was founded by the Jesuits in 1950.

The College offers the Baccalaureate in both Science and Technology and Humanities and Social Sciences. Bilingual education, Spanish and English, is emphasized. Technical education includes the three areas of Commercial, Administrative Management, and Electrical Installations, Equipment, and Apparatus. 

Immaculate Heart of Mary high school has been ranked among the top 100 schools in Spain.

See also
 List of Jesuit sites

References

External links

Jesuit secondary schools in Spain
Catholic schools in Spain
Schools in Seville
Educational institutions established in 1950
1950 establishments in Spain